In the theory of stochastic processes, a ν-transform is an operation that transforms a measure or a point process into a different point process. Intuitively the ν-transform randomly relocates the points of the point process, with the type of relocation being dependent on the position of each point.

Definition

For measures 
This means that

Let  be independent random elements with distribution . Then the point process

is called the ν-transform of the measure  if it is locally finite, meaning that  for every bounded set

For point processes 

Properties

Stability 

Therefore, the -transform of a Poisson process with intensity measure  is a Cox process directed by a random measure with distribution .

Laplace transform 

for all bounded, positive and measurable functions .

References 

Point processes